One Man's Island is a non-fiction book written by David Conover carries on the story begun in Once Upon an Island, but in a totally different style and format.  Written some thirteen years after the experience described in Once Upon an Island, this book presents another year in the life of the couple who began their island paradise.  This book is based on the diary Conover kept and presents a mixture of his experiences as he was writing his first book and philosophical insights and wisdom which he collected during his life on the island.

Excerpt
A sample of what he wrote:

IN MAKING LOVE, or making a dessert, I am the constant novice. When I am not learning I am not living.  The tragedy of our life is our inability to grow, to change, to stretch.  Every day beckons me to enlarge myself.  I wire or shingle a cotage in the morning; make camera studies, repair a wharf ora generator, and catch a salmon in the afternoon; write a chapter, study the Greeks, or create a poem at night.  My curiosity keeps me in a perpetual state of adolescence.  Every tool I see I wish to use; every skill I wish to practice. Living is so exciting, I find it difficult to apply myself to any other occupation.

References

1971 non-fiction books
American non-fiction books